The Geoagel is a left tributary of the river Geoagiu in Romania. It discharges into the Geoagiu in Cheia.

References

Rivers of Romania
Rivers of Alba County